The Bhote Koshi Power Plant (also known as Upper Bhote Koshi Project) is a run-of-the-river power plant in Sindhulpalchok District, Nepal. It was constructed between 1997 and 2000 with power generation starting in January 2001. The project cost about US$98 million. The majority of finances was provided by Panda Energy International.

The installed capacity of the project is 44 MW, whereas it has a power purchase agreement (PPA) with Nepal Electricity Authority for generation of 36MW maximum. The PPA dictates how much the project can generate for each month of the Nepali Calendar.
During monsoon season (about three months each year) Bhote Koshi can operate at full installed capacity, with excess water still being spilt. During winter season however, power generation from the plant decreases drastically due to low river flows.

References

External links

Bhote Koshi Power Company Pvt. Ltd.

Dams completed in 2000
Energy infrastructure completed in 2001
Dams in Nepal
Hydroelectric power stations in Nepal
Run-of-the-river power stations
2000 establishments in Nepal
Buildings and structures in Sindhupalchowk District